A Treppenspeicher (literally "staircase store") is the German term for a granary or secondary farm building used for storage and typical of the Lüneburg Heath area in northern Germany. The upper storey of the store was usually accessed via a flight of steps on the outside of the building, usually at one of the gable ends, thus giving the building its name.

Description 
Treppenspeicher are only relatively small buildings. They are witness to the craftsmanship of carpenters in the farming community. Their solid, wooden construction ensured that the interior stayed dry and they were so tightly planked that the stored produce was protected from mice.
These stores used to be built within sight, but at a distance from the main farmhouse. This ensured that, if the farmhouse caught fire, the fire would not spread to the stores. They were often used as sleeping accommodation for farm hands.

Treppenspeicher were typical of the Lüneburg Heath. Here they remained in use until well into the 19th century. They increasingly disappeared however because they are no longer practical today. Nowadays the store rooms are normally part of the farmhouse itself.

In former times there was at least one, but usually several, stores on each heath farm, serving all sorts of purposes. They were used to store grain, buckwheat, flax, cotton, linen, wool, honey, meat, bacon and clothes. They were often used as sleeping accommodation for the farmhands.

Surviving Treppenspeicher 
Today, Treppenspeicher may be visited at the following places on the Lüneberg Heath:

 Lutterloh
 Hermannsburg Local History Museum
 Schröershof and Schäferhof Farms in Neuenkirchen
 Stimbekhof Farm in Oberhaverbeck
 Peetshof Farm in Wietzendorf
 De Theeshof Local History Museum in Schneverdingen

Gallery

References

Bibliography 
 Eitzen, Gerhard (2006). Bauernhausforschung in Deutschland: gesammelte Aufsätze 1938 bis 1980. PD-Verlag.
 Stuhrwohldt, Alfred (1936). Die Treppenspeicher in der Lüneburger Heide, Brunswick: TH Carola-Wilhelmina. 

Granaries
Lüneburg Heath